Behadd (English: Boundless) is a 2013 Pakistani drama film directed by Asim Raza, produced by Momina Duraid, and written by Umera Ahmad. The telefilm stars Fawad Khan, Nadia Jamil, Sajjal Ali, Nadia Afgan, Adnan Siddiqui, Adnan Jaffar and Shamoon Abbasi in pivot roles. Behadd was premiered on 23 February 2013 by Hum TV. It was also aired in India on Zindagi, premiering on 30 August 2014.

Behadd reflects upon the relationship dynamics of a 'Parent' and 'Child', and shows how their love for one another becomes the cause of their heartache and the reflection of 'selflessness' verses 'selfishness' in love. Behadd received a Hum Award for Best Television Film at 2nd Hum Awards.

Plot
The story revolves around Masooma, a.k.a. Mo (Nadia Jamil), a working woman and single mother who lives with her fifteen-year-old daughter Maha (Sajjal Ali). After losing her husband in a road accident, Maha becomes Masooma's sole reason for existence; Maha grows into an introvert and is highly possessive of her mother.

One day, Masooma bumps into her best friend's younger brother, Jamal Ahmad, a.k.a. Jo (Fawad Khan). Jamal is Masooma's childhood friend and a divorcee. He visits Masooma's house for dinner and gels well with Maha. Masooma is surprised as Maha usually doesn't warm up to people so quickly. Jo's sister, Poppy (Nausheen), asks Masooma to find a girl for Jo, as she thinks Jo is very young and should remarry. Masooma introduces Shaista (Hira Tareen) to Jo at lunch, where Jo behaves carelessly and shows no interest in the proposal.

Jo starts spending a lot of time with Masooma and Maha, the latter warming up to him even more. Jo soon realises his love for Mo, and waits for the perfect moment to propose to Masooma, leaving her shocked. She refuses as she is a single mother five years older than him. Masooma also feels that Maha will never adjust to having a new father. However, Jo asks her to reconsider her decision as he genuinely loves and respects her and considers Maha, his daughter. Masooma's friend Shafaq (Nadia Afgan) makes her realise that she will never get a better husband than Jo. Shafaq assures her that Jo can be the father figure in Maha's life. 

Masooma tells Maha about Jo's proposal and tells her they need someone like Jo in their lives. He has all the qualities of a good companion and a great person. Masooma also says that she will not accept the proposal if Maha is uncomfortable. Though a little taken aback by the proposal, Maha gives her consent to the marriage.

A few days later, Masooma asks Jamal to pick Maha up from school as she is caught up with work. When she returns, she finds Maha screaming,  seemingly due to Jamal sexually harassing her. Masooma is left guilt-ridden and heartbroken, and she breaks up with Jamal. After six months, Masooma decides to send Maha to London for higher studies, but Maha refuses to go. Maha confides in Shafaq that she framed Jamal because Masooma was falling in love with him, and she had become insecure about losing her mother. 

Shafaq tells Maha the importance of Jamal in their lives. Maha then leaves Shafaq's house to apologise to Jamal and tells him why she accused him. Jamal tells her that it is up to her and Masooma to decide whether she wants him in their lives or not. He also reveals that Masooma is aware of the truth. Jamal explains that after two weeks of the incident, Masooma saw CCTV footage from that day and realised that Jamal was innocent.

Masooma secretly watches Maha apologise to Jamal; both mother and daughter become emotional and hug each other.

Cast
 Principal Cast
 Fawad Khan as Jamal "Jo" Ahmed
 Nadia Jamil as Masooma "Mo" Jamal
 Sajal Ali as Maha 
 Nadia Afgan as Shafaq 
 Nasheen Masud as Popi "Po" Masood
 Rahma Saleem as Fareena 
 Sana Javed as Laiba (Cameo)
 Aiman Khan as Sara
 Zainab Raza as Maha's childhood
 Maryam Raza as Maha's school friend

 Special Appearance
 Adnan Siddiqui as Hassan (Masooma's husband)
 Adnan Jaffar as Shafaq's husband 
 Shamoon Abbasi as Masooma's boss
 Hira Tareen as Shaista (Jo's proposal)

Production
In 2013, Asim Raza announced in an interview with Daily Times that he will mark his directional debut with Behadd which will be a television film, better known as a 'telefilm' in Pakistan, he clarifies that it will be "a long play with substance will be at par with a telefilm." In mid of 2013 casting of telefilm was confirmed with the cast of Fawad Khan, Nadia Jamil, Sajjal Ali and Nadia Afgan in central roles, while Adnan Siddiqui, Adnan Jaffar and Shamoon Abbasi joined the cast for supporting roles.

Filming
Filming began on 21 April 2013 in Karachi, Sindh. Shooting last for month, editing and other production stages were completed before 28 May 2013.

Music

Title song of Behadd known as Original Soundtrack was given by Music band Kaavish which is produced, written and composed by Jaffer Zaidi and Maaz Maudood while one song was taken from the season two of Coke Studio Pakistan sung and penned down by Zeb and Haniya and produced by Rohail Hyatt. Background score for film was given by Fawad Khan himself along with Hasil Qureshi.

Track listing

Reception

Release

The film debuted on Hum TV on 8 June 2013, at 9:10 p.m., and had an later on-airing at Zee Zindagi on 30 August 2014. Hum TV also holds a red carpet premier for Behadd.

In April 2020, Hum TV uploaded it on official YouTube channel. It is also available under Zee Zindagi on ZEE5 app to stream online.

Critical response

The film received praise for Asim Raza's direction, Umera Ahmad's story and successful transmission of story into play, acting (particular that of Fawad Khan, Nadia Jamil, Sajjal Ali and Nadia Afgan), drama, moral messages and production values.

Despite strong positive reviews, there was much speculation that Behadd follows the same plot of Hasina Moin's 1980 PTV classic story Gudiya – (Doll).

Accolades

See also

 2013 in Pakistani television 
 List of programs broadcast by Hum TV

References

External links 
 Official website  
 
 Behadd on YouTube
 Behadd on Tumblr 
 Other resources 
 Behadd on DramasOnline 
 Reviews
 Behadd official review by Reema Ali Syed
 Behadd review by Fatima Awan. 
 Behadd review by Zainab Imam

Hum TV original programming
2013 television films
2013 films
2013 Pakistani television series debuts
Pakistani drama television series
Pakistani television films
Urdu-language television shows
Pakistani romance television series
2013 Pakistani television series endings
Films set in Karachi
Zee Zindagi original programming
Films directed by Asim Raza